The Fighting Three is a 1927 American silent Western film directed by Albert S. Rogell and starring Jack Hoxie, Olive Hasbrouck and Marin Sais.

The film's sets were designed by the art director David S. Garber.

Cast
 Jack Hoxie as Jack Conway 
 Olive Hasbrouck as Jeanne D'Arcy 
 Marin Sais as Clara Jones 
 Fanny Warren as Widow 
 William Malan as John D'Arcy 
 Buck Connors as Marshal Skinner 
 William J. Dyer as Timothy 
 Henry Roquemore as Revere 
 William Bailey as Steve Clayton
 Scout the Horse as Jack's Horse 
 Bunk the Dog as Jack's Dog

References

External links
 

1927 films
1927 Western (genre) films
1920s English-language films
American black-and-white films
Universal Pictures films
Films directed by Albert S. Rogell
Silent American Western (genre) films
1920s American films